Lichfield Court, in Richmond, London, consists of two Grade II listed purpose-built blocks of flats. Designed by Bertram Carter and built in fine Streamline Moderne style, it was completed in 1935.

Lichfield House
Lichfield Court is built on the site of Lichfield House, named when the London residence of the Bishop of Lichfield. Wealthy sugar factor Henry Lascelles (1690–1753) bought the house and died there by suicide. Novelist Mary Elizabeth Braddon (1837–1915), lived there from before 1874 until her death. The house was described in 1907 as a "grand old red brick building with a beautiful formal garden". Sir Henry George Norris was the final resident. The house and grounds were acquired in 1933 by George Broadbridge and redeveloped into the present two blocks of flats.

Design
The company estate office and porters' office are situated in the main lobby of the major block. The buildings are surrounded by estate grounds which are a mix of gardens and unallocated parking, the major block having a decorative inner courtyard garden and pond.  Initially intended for the rental market, the flats conformed to six different types ranging from studio flats with no alcove, to studio flats with one alcove or two alcoves, and one to three-bedroom flats, some with balconies.

Listed status

The buildings were awarded grade II listing in January 2004. The Twentieth Century Society reported the listing, saying:

Popular culture

Lichfield Court was used as Gerda's flat in the TV adaptation of Agatha Christie's novel One, Two, Buckle My Shoe.

Notes and references

External links
Official site of Lichfield Court

1935 establishments in England
Apartment buildings in London
Art Deco architecture in London
Grade II listed buildings in the London Borough of Richmond upon Thames
Residential buildings completed in 1935
Richmond, London
Streamline Moderne architecture in the United Kingdom
Christopher Wren buildings